The 2013 Nova Scotia general election was held on October 8, 2013, to elect members to the Nova Scotia House of Assembly.

The result of the election was a Liberal victory under the leadership of Stephen McNeil, with the party winning its first election since 1998. The Progressive Conservatives, under the leadership of Jamie Baillie, improved on their 2009 results and formed the Official Opposition, despite winning fewer votes than the New Democratic Party (NDP). The NDP, which had won power for the first time in 2009 under the leadership of Darrell Dexter was reduced to third place and became only the second one-term government in the province's history, and the first since 1882. Dexter himself was defeated in Cole Harbour-Portland Valley by Liberal candidate Tony Ince.

Timeline
 June 24, 2009 – The New Democratic Party under Darrell Dexter win 31 out of 52 seats. The Progressive Conservatives are reduced to 10 seats and Rodney MacDonald announces that he will step down as leader. Karen Casey is named as interim leader.
 September 4, 2009 – Antigonish MLA Angus MacIsaac resigns his seat, citing family reasons.
 September 10, 2009 – Former Premier Rodney MacDonald resigns his Inverness seat in the legislature.
 October 20, 2009 – By-elections are held in Inverness and Antigonish. PC candidate Allan MacMaster and NDP candidate Maurice Smith are elected, respectively.
 February 9, 2010 – Richard Hurlburt resigns from the legislature following revelations that he had spent his constituency allowance on a generator and a 40" television, which together cost over $11,000.
 March 11, 2010 – Dave Wilson resigns from the legislature and is later charged and pleaded guilty.
 March 25, 2010 – Trevor Zinck is suspended from the NDP caucus over problems with his constituency expenses.
 June 22, 2010 – Two byelections are held to replace Hurlburt and Wilson in Yarmouth and Glace Bay, respectively. Zach Churchill is elected in Yarmouth and Geoff MacLellan is elected in Glace Bay.
 August 16, 2010 – Karen Casey announces her resignation as interim leader of the Progressive Conservatives.
 August 18, 2010 – Jamie Baillie is chosen as leader of the Progressive Conservative Party.
 October 26, 2010 – Jamie Baillie wins a byelection and represents the constituency of Cumberland South.
 January 10, 2011 – PC MLA Karen Casey crosses the floor to join the Liberal caucus.
 February 14, 2011 – Trevor Zinck is announced as one of four people facing criminal charges in connection with the RCMP investigation into 2010s MLA expense scandal. Zinck is charged with fraud exceeding $5,000, breach of trust by a public officer, and 2 counts of theft over $5,000.
 March 25, 2011 – Cape Breton North PC MLA Cecil Clarke resigns his seat to run in the 2011 federal election.
 June 21, 2011 – PC candidate Eddie Orrell wins the by-election in Cape Breton North.
 April 19, 2012 – Former MLA Dave Wilson is sentenced to 9 months in jail and to a period of 18 months probation for his role in the expenses scandal.
 June 5, 2012 – The Atlantica Party is deregistered by Elections Nova Scotia.
 July 27, 2012 – Former MLA Richard Hurlburt is sentenced to 12 months of house arrest, followed by 12 months of probation for his role in the expenses scandal.
 September 25, 2012 – The Nova Scotia Electoral Boundaries Commission released their final report on riding redistribution, which recommends dropping one seat in the legislature.
 December 6, 2012 – The law to implement new electoral boundaries in the province was passed in the legislature.
 May 29, 2013 – Manning MacDonald resigns his seat in the legislature as MLA for Cape Breton South.
 June 19, 2013 – Trevor Zinck resigns his seat in the legislature after he pleaded guilty to charges of fraud and breach of trust.
 September 7, 2013 – Premier Darrell Dexter calls a general election for October 8, 2013.

Campaign

The election campaign began the week after Labour Day, when the legislature would normally have been expected to return to work, had there been no election campaign.  As criticism or defence of government policy would dominate the agenda, and by convention electoral mandates are understood to last about four years, despite a lack of fixed election dates, the timing was not controversial.

The Muskrat Falls or Lower Churchill Project, its associated Maritime Link, and electricity policy generally, immediately emerged as the key issue in the early campaign.  .  Liberals emphasized Nova Scotia Power's (NSPI) dominance of power generation, and its ability to exclude alternatives through its near-monopoly ownership of the distribution network, covering 129/130 Nova Scotians.  They also promised to remove a conservation charge, named for demand response programs that never materialized (though many passive conservation programs run by Efficiency Nova Scotia did prove effective) – instead proposing that NSPI pay for it from its return.  Liberals and Conservatives criticized NSPI's unaccountable 9.2% guaranteed rate of return even for unwise investments.  Conservatives acknowledged that it was under pressure to meet a tough renewable standard (which they would relax) but also promised to freeze rates.  The NDP government continued to defend Muskrat Falls as the only viable alternative to replace coal-fired power, even though this project was before the Nova Scotia Utilities Review Board as of the election call, remained unchanged and this was reflected in their campaign materials – they criticized the Liberal plan as likely to lead to higher power rates.  The basis for these criticisms was unclear.  However, a similar attempt to open generation competition in New Brunswick failed, in part because New Brunswick Power retained monopoly control of the distribution and transmission network, which intimidates competitors and makes it easy in practice to exclude them.

Other issues in the campaign:
A proposed passenger ferry from Yarmouth, Nova Scotia to Portland, Maine, re-instituting summer service that ran for decades until the 1990s, replacing a car-focused service that ran to Bar Harbor, Maine until the NDP government cancelled it.  This was of particular interest to South Shore candidates, especially Yarmouth.  Associated issues include the collapse of all public transit on the South Shore (with the withdrawal of TryTown from operating public buses from Yarmouth to Halifax) and a general lack of transport strategy, that could leave some of the 130,000 passengers per year stranded.  It remained unclear as of election time whether an announced deal to resume service May 1, 2014, had held, and what other transport policy applied   Darrell Dexter had referred to stories from Yarmouth about the impact of the loss of ferries a "mythology"  which effectively made this a campaign issue before the campaign had begun.

Party standings

Results by party

Results by region

Retiring incumbents

The following incumbent MLAs did not run for re-election: 
Liberal
 Wayne Gaudet, Clare
 Harold "Junior" Theriault, Digby-Annapolis

New Democratic
Vicki Conrad, Queens
Howard Epstein, Halifax Chebucto
Bill Estabrooks, Timberlea-Prospect
Marilyn More, Dartmouth South-Portland Valley
Michele Raymond, Halifax Atlantic
Graham Steele, Halifax Fairview

Nominated candidates

Legend
bold denotes party leader
† denotes an incumbent who is not running for re-election or was defeated in nomination contest

Annapolis Valley

|-
|bgcolor=whitesmoke|Annapolis
|
|Henry Spurr834 8.17%
||
|Stephen McNeil7,71075.52%
|
|Ginny Hurlock1,39013.62%
|
|Ron Neufeld2272.22%
|
| 
||
|Stephen McNeil
|-
|rowspan=3 bgcolor=whitesmoke|Clare-Digby
|rowspan=3|
|rowspan=3|Dean Kenley8428.90%
|rowspan=3 |
|rowspan=3|Gordon Wilson5,12254.13%
|rowspan=3|
|rowspan=3|Paul Emile LeBlanc2,91130.77%
|rowspan=3|
|rowspan=3| 
|rowspan=3|
|rowspan=3|Ian Thurber4925.20%
||
|Wayne Gaudet†
|-
|colspan=2 align="center"|merged district
|-
||
|Harold Theriault†
|-
|bgcolor=whitesmoke|Hants West
|
|Brian Stephens88810.03%
|
|Claude O'Hara3,27937.03%
||
|Chuck Porter4,46850.46%
|
|Torin Buzek1691.91%
|
|
||
|Chuck Porter
|-
|bgcolor=whitesmoke|Kings North
|
|Jim Morton2,88232.09%
|
|Stephen Pearl2,78731.03%
||
|John Lohr2,90332.32%
|
|Mary Lou Harley3624.03%
|
|
||
|Jim Morton
|-
|bgcolor=whitesmoke|Kings South
|
|Ramona Jennex3,51135.29%
||
|Keith Irving3,87838.98%
|
|Shane Buchan 2,26322.75%
|
|Sheila Richardson2522.53%
|
|
||
|Ramona Jennex
|-
|bgcolor=whitesmoke|Kings West
|
|Bob Landry6037.58%
||
|Leo Glavine5,88574.01%
|
|Jody Frowley1,27516.03%
|
|Barbara Lake1571.97%
|
|
||
|Leo Glavine
|}

South Shore

|-
|bgcolor=whitesmoke|Argyle-Barrington
|
|Kenn Baynton3554.89%
|
|Kent Blades2,90540.05%
||
|Chris d'Entremont3,93554.25%
|
|
|
|
||
|Chris d'Entremont
|-
|bgcolor=whitesmoke|Chester-St. Margaret's
||
|Denise Peterson-Rafuse3,34135.01%
|
|Tim Harris2,94330.84%
|
|Janet Irwin 3,19333.46%
|
|
|
|
||
|Denise Peterson-Rafuse
|-
|bgcolor=whitesmoke|Lunenburg
|
|Pam Birdsall2,76832.60%
||
|Suzanne Lohnes-Croft3,18237.48%
|
|Brian Pickings2,46529.03%
|
|
|
|
||
|Pam Birdsall
|-
|bgcolor=whitesmoke|Lunenburg West
|
|Gary Ramey2,88531.48%
||
|Mark Furey3,93142.89%
|
|David Mitchell 2,14323.38%
|
|Robert Pierce1601.75%
|
|
||
|Gary Ramey
|-
|rowspan=3 bgcolor=whitesmoke|Queens-Shelburne
|rowspan=3 |
|rowspan=3|Sterling Belliveau3,06636.86%
|rowspan=3|
|rowspan=3|Benson Frail2,30227.67%
|rowspan=3|
|rowspan=3|Bruce Inglis2,68532.28%
|rowspan=3|
|rowspan=3|Madeline Taylor2112.54%
|rowspan=3|
|rowspan=3|
||
|Sterling Belliveau
|-
|colspan=2 align="center"|merged district
|-
||
|Vicki Conrad†
|-
|bgcolor=whitesmoke|Yarmouth
|
|Charles Webster2172.50%
||
|Zach Churchill7,13082.03%
|
|John Cunningham1,23314.19%
|
|Vanessa Goodwin-Clairmont830.95%
|
|
||
|Zach Churchill
|}

Fundy-Northeast

|-
|bgcolor=whitesmoke|Colchester-Musquodoboit Valley
|
|Gary Burrill2,29329.13%
|
|Tom Martin2,22028.20%
||
|Larry Harrison3,30441.97%
|
|
|
|
||
|Gary Burrill
|-
|bgcolor=whitesmoke|Colchester North
|
|Jim Wyatt1,03712.57%
||
|Karen Casey5,00360.65%
|
|John MacDonald 2,16226.21%
|
|
|
|
||
|Karen Casey
|-
|bgcolor=whitesmoke|Cumberland North
|
|Brian Skabar1,97426.44%
||
|Terry Farrell2,94439.43%
|
|Judith Giroux 2,21229.62%
|
|Jason Blanch2793.74%
|
|
||
|Brian Skabar
|-
|bgcolor=whitesmoke|Cumberland South
|
|Larry Duchesne4866.73%|
|Kenny Jackson2,88439.93%||
|Jamie Baillie 3,65550.61%|
|Bruce McCulloch1472.04%|
|
||
|Jamie Baillie
|-
|bgcolor=whitesmoke|Hants East
|
|John MacDonell3,41235.58%||
|Margaret Miller4,51247.05%|
|Kim Williams1,59716.65%|
|
|
|
||
|John MacDonell
|-
|bgcolor=whitesmoke|Truro–Bible Hill–Millbrook–Salmon River
||
|Lenore Zann3,16537.75%|
|Barry Mellish2,68231.99%|
|Charles Cox 2,47029.46%|
|
|
|
||
|Lenore Zann
|}

Central Halifax

|-
|bgcolor=whitesmoke|Clayton Park West
|
|Blake Wright1,51517.22%||
|Diana Whalen5,92967.40%|
|Jaime D. Allen1,29914.77%|
|
|
|
||
|Diana Whalen
|-
|bgcolor=whitesmoke|Fairview-Clayton Park
|
|Abad Khan2,27431.19%||
|Patricia Arab3,36446.15%|
|Travis Price1,29417.75%|
|Raland Kinley1772.43%|
| Katie Campbell1361.87%||
|New Riding|-
|bgcolor=whitesmoke|Halifax Armdale
|
|Drew Moore2,20333.67%||
|Lena Diab3,20849.04%|
|Irvine Carvery1,06116.22%|
|
|
|
||
|Graham Steele†
|-
|bgcolor=whitesmoke|Halifax Chebucto
|
|Gregor Ash3,37638.25%||
|Joachim Stroink4,35249.30%|
|Christine Dewell 8749.90%|
|
|
|Michael Marshall1251.42%||
|Howard Epstein†
|-
|bgcolor=whitesmoke|Halifax Citadel-Sable Island
|
|Leonard Preyra1,93430.82%||
|Labi Kousoulis2,96647.27%|
|Andrew Black1,09417.43%|
|Brynn Horley1983.16%|
|Frederic Boileau-Cadieux310.49%||
|Leonard Preyra
|-
|bgcolor=whitesmoke|Halifax Needham
||
|Maureen MacDonald3,39243.59%|
|Chris Poole3,11540.03%|
|Mary Hamblin83410.72%|
|Kris MacLellan3694.74%|
|
||
|Maureen MacDonald
|}

Suburban Halifax

|-
|bgcolor=whitesmoke|Bedford
|
|Mike Poworoznyk1,70116.86%||
|Kelly Regan6,08160.29%|
|Joan Christie2,02620.09%|
|Ian Charles2172.15%|
|
||
|Kelly Regan

|-
|bgcolor=whitesmoke|Halifax Atlantic
|
|Tanis Crosby2,57933.37%||
|Brendan Maguire3,24441.98%|
|Ryan Brennan1,81723.51%|
|
|
|
||
|Michèle Raymond†
|-
|bgcolor=whitesmoke|Hammonds Plains-Lucasville
|
|Peter Lund1,58424.23%||
|Ben Jessome3,40252.04%|
|Gina Byrne1,42321.77%|
|
|
|Jonathan Dean1041.59%||
|New Riding|-
|bgcolor=whitesmoke|Sackville-Beaver Bank
|
|Mat Whynott2,36936.75%||
|Stephen Gough2,57039.87%|
|Sarah Reeves 1,45222.53%|
|
|
|
||
|Mat Whynott
|-
|bgcolor=whitesmoke|Sackville-Cobequid
||
|Dave Wilson2,98338.16%|
|Graham Cameron2,89837.07%|
|Peter Mac Isaac1,65121.12%|
|John Percy2272.90%|
|
||
|Dave Wilson
|-
|bgcolor=whitesmoke|Timberlea-Prospect
|
|Linda Moxsom-Skinner2,16825.23%||
|Iain Rankin4,49252.27%|
|Bruce Pretty1,58818.48%|
|Thomas Trappenberg2933.41%|
|
||
|Bill Estabrooks†
|-
|bgcolor=whitesmoke|Waverley-Fall River-Beaver Bank
|
|Percy Paris2,09825.03%||
|Bill Horne3,58842.81%|
|Brian Wong2,64031.50%|
|
| 
|
||
|Percy Paris
|}

Dartmouth/Cole Harbour/Eastern Shore

|-
|bgcolor=whitesmoke|Cole Harbour-Eastern Passage
|
|Becky Kent2,91438.41%||
|Joyce Treen3,05740.30%|
|Lloyd Jackson1,55520.50%|
|
|
|
||
|Becky Kent
|-
|bgcolor=whitesmoke|Cole Harbour-Portland Valley
|
|Darrell Dexter3,98140.51%||
|Tony Ince4,00240.72%|
|Greg Frampton1,76918.00%|
|
|
|
||
|Darrell Dexter
|-
|bgcolor=whitesmoke|Dartmouth East
|
|Deborah Stover1,92922.33%||
|Andrew Younger5,46963.32%|
|Mike MacDonell1,16713.51%|
|
|
|
||
|Andrew Younger
|-
|bgcolor=whitesmoke|Dartmouth North
|
|Steve Estey2,02029.86%||
|Joanne Bernard2,95343.66%|
|Sean Brownlow1,72925.56%|
|
|
| 
||
|Vacant
|-
|bgcolor=whitesmoke|Dartmouth South
|
|Mary Vingoe2,91832.99%||
|Allan Rowe4,04945.78%|
|Gord Gamble1,61218.23%|
|
|
|Jim Murray1782.01%||
|Marilyn More†
|-
|bgcolor=whitesmoke|Eastern Shore
|
|Sid Prest1,92226.77%||
|Kevin Murphy3,77052.50%|
|Stephen Brine1,42319.82%|
|
|
|
||
|Sid Prest
|-
|bgcolor=whitesmoke|Preston-Dartmouth
|
|Andre Cain1,81631.44%||
|Keith Colwell3,32657.58%|
|Andrew Mecke5549.59%|
|
|
|
||
|Keith Colwell
|}

Central Nova

|-
|bgcolor=whitesmoke|Antigonish
|
|Maurice Smith2,32425.39%||
|Randy Delorey3,88242.40%|
|Darren Thompson2,86831.33%|
|
|
|
||
|Maurice Smith
|-
|bgcolor=whitesmoke|Guysborough–Eastern Shore–Tracadie
|
|Jim Boudreau2,36732.56%||
|Lloyd Hines2,87639.56%|
|Neil DeCoff1,94726.78%|
|
|
|
||
|Jim Boudreau
|-
|bgcolor=whitesmoke|Pictou Centre
|
|Ross Landry2,37329.67%|
|Bill Muirhead1,41517.69%||
|Pat Dunn4,14751.84%|
|
|
|
||
|Ross Landry
|-
|bgcolor=whitesmoke|Pictou East
|
|Clarrie MacKinnon2,78835.82%|
|Francois Rochon1,22815.78%||
|Tim Houston3,71447.71%|
|
|
|
||
|Clarrie MacKinnon
|-
|bgcolor=whitesmoke|Pictou West
|
|Charlie Parker2,58834.01%|
|Glennie Langille1,93325.40%||
|Karla MacFarlane3,02639.77%|
|
|
|
||
|Charlie Parker
|}

Cape Breton

|-
|bgcolor=whitesmoke|Cape Breton Centre
||
|Frank Corbett3,44045.03%|
|David Wilton3,28242.96%|
|Edna Lee87311.43%|
|
|
|
||
|Frank Corbett
|-
|bgcolor=whitesmoke|Cape Breton-Richmond
|
|Bert Lewis1,66721.39%||
|Michel Samson4,36956.06%|
|Joe Janega1,69621.76%|
|
|
|
||
|Michel Samson
|-
|bgcolor=whitesmoke|Glace Bay
|
|Mary Beth MacDonald1,00114.37%||
|Geoff MacLellan5,54779.61%|
|Tom Bethell3555.09%|
|
|
|
||
|Geoff MacLellan
|-
|bgcolor=whitesmoke|Inverness
|
|Michelle Smith6788.68%|
|Jackie Rankin3,24841.58%||
|Allan MacMaster3,81648.85%|
|
|
|
||
|Allan MacMaster
|-
|bgcolor=whitesmoke|Northside-Westmount
|
|Cecil Snow1,59716.69%|
|John Higgins3,71638.83%||
|Eddie Orrell4,17943.67%|
|
|
|
||
|Eddie Orrell
|-
|bgcolor=whitesmoke|Sydney River-Mira-Louisbourg
|
|Delton McDonald1,57316.35%|
|Josephine Kennedy3,79839.47%||
|Alfie MacLeod4,17843.42%|
|
|
|
||
|Alfie MacLeod
|-
|rowspan=3 bgcolor=whitesmoke|Sydney-Whitney Pier
|rowspan=3 |
|rowspan=3|Gordie Gosse5,08449.07%|rowspan=3|
|rowspan=3|Derek Mombourquette4,53443.76%|rowspan=3|
|rowspan=3|Leslie MacPhee6806.56%|rowspan=3|
|rowspan=3| 
|rowspan=3|
|rowspan=3|
||
|Gordie Gosse
|-
|colspan=2 align="center"|merged district|-
| 
|Vacant
|-
|bgcolor=whitesmoke|Victoria-The Lakes
|
|John Frank Toney1,90723.44%||
|Pam Eyking3,15038.71%|
|Keith Bain2,84734.99%|
|
|
|Stemer MacLeod1722.11%''
||
|Keith Bain
|}

Opinion polls

Analysis

On election night, the Liberal Party formed a majority government by a comfortable margin. This was the first time the Liberals had formed government in Nova Scotia since 1999, and their first majority government victory since the 1993 election. From mid 2012, the Liberals had led every public poll and entered the campaign with a 20-point lead over the New Democratic Party (NDP).

While the Liberals had been relatively successful in the Annapolis Valley and on Cape Breton Island during the 2009 election, they were completely shut out of the South Shore, Fundy, and Central Nova Scotia. More importantly, the NDP had dominated the Halifax metropolitan area, winning 14 out of 20 seats. In 2009, the NDP had been able to count on a large number of ridings in and around Halifax, while achieving historic gains across the province, including in traditionally Progressive Conservative (PC) and Liberal areas of rural Nova Scotia. In 2009, the PCs fell from first place to third place in the Legislature, and were completely shut out of the Halifax metropolitan area.

In the 2013 election, NDP support collapsed across the province, as it lost all of its seats in Central Nova Scotia, three of its seats in Fundy, and three of its seats on the South Shore. However, the most important shift was in the Halifax metropolitan area, where NDP support dropped from 54.07% in 2009 to 31.29% in 2013. The party wound up losing 13 of its seats, as the Liberals won 18 of 20 seats in and around Halifax. Strong NDP areas in 2009, like Dartmouth, Central Halifax, and suburban areas north and east of the Harbour swung from the NDP to the Liberals.  Among the casualties was Dexter, who lost his own seat to Liberal challenger Tony Ince by 21 votes.  He was the first premier since Ernest Armstrong to be defeated in his own riding.

The NDP had very poor vote concentration in the 2013 election. In Halifax, where it won 31.29% of the vote, it won only two seats.  While the party finished second in the popular vote ahead of the PCs, its support was spread out around the province and not concentrated in enough areas to translate into seats.  Combined with its collapse in Halifax, this left the NDP with only seven seats to the Tories' 11.

References

External links
 Elections Nova Scotia
 Elections Nova Scotia - October 8, 2013 Nova Scotia Provincial General Election
 Nova Scotia Votes 2013 (CBC News)
 2013 NS Votes (The Chronicle Herald)
 62nd Nova Scotia General Election (ThreeHundredEight.com)
 Nova Scotia Election 2013 (Election Almanac)

2013 elections in Canada
2013 in Nova Scotia
2013
October 2013 events in Canada